Majuwa may refer to:

Majuwa, Ramechhap, Nepal
Majuwa, Sindhuli, Nepal